The A957 road, commonly called the Slug Road,(/slɒxk/; Scottish Gaelic: An Sloc), is a two lane paved public roadway in Aberdeenshire, Scotland connecting Stonehaven to the A93 road near Crathes after crossing the River Dee, Aberdeenshire over Durris Bridge.

History and route
The A957 passes slightly to the south of the historic Ury Estate and somewhat to the north of Rickarton House. Proceeding northwesterly, the Slug Road passes by Fetteresso Forest and Durris Forest and eventually by the Balbridie Neolithic timber hall.

The etymology of Slug Road is asserted to be a derivation of the Gaelic word sloc for hollow or long, deep, parallel-sided depression, thus named due to the road traversing a narrow mountain pass.

See also
Cowie Water
Fetteresso Forest
Raedykes

References

Roads in Scotland
Transport in Aberdeenshire